Neptunium diarsenide is a binary inorganic compound of neptunium and arsenic with the chemical formula . The compound forms crystals.

Synthesis
Heating stoichiometric amounts of neptunium hydride and arsenic:

Physical properties
Neptunium diarsenide forms crystals of the tetragonal system, space group P4/nmm, cell parameters a = 0.3958 nm, c = 0.8098 nm.

References

Neptunium compounds
Arsenides
Inorganic compounds